Mary "Beth" Palmer (August 14, 1952 – October 2, 2019) was an American bridge player from Chevy Chase, Maryland. She was an attorney. At the time of her death, she was 11th in the World Bridge Federation women's rankings by PPs (which do not age off) and 15th by MPs.

At the SportAccord World Mind Games in Beijing, December 2011, Palmer and Lynn Deas won the "Pairs Women" gold medal. Not a world championship meet, the SportAccord WMG invited 24 women from Great Britain, France, China, and the U.S. to compete in three small tournaments as four national teams, twelve pairs, and 24 individuals. The six U.S. women also won the Teams gold medal.

Bridge accomplishments

Wins
 World Championships (6)
 Venice Cup (2) 1987,1989
 McConnell Cup (1) 2002
 World Bridge Games (1) 2016
 World Mixed Teams (1) 2018
 Womens Pairs (1) 2010
 North American Bridge Championships (29)
 Rockwell Mixed Pairs (1) 1985
 Smith Life Master Women's Pairs (2) 1983, 1985
 Machlin Women's Swiss Teams (5) 1987, 1995, 1996, 2007, 2012
 Wagar Women's Knockout Teams (8) 1985, 1999, 2002, 2003, 2005, 2008, 2010, 2013
 Sternberg Women's Board-a-Match Teams (5) 1992, 1995, 2005, 2006, 2008, 2014, 2016
 Roth Open Swiss Teams (1) 2017
 Chicago Mixed Board-a-Match (5) 1982, 1992, 1993, 2004, 2006

Runners-up
 World Championships (5)
 Venice Cup (3) 2009,2015 (silver) 1997 (bronze)
 Womens Pairs (1) 1982 (silver) 1994 (bronze)
 North American Bridge Championships (11)
 Smith Life Master Women's Pairs (1) 1989
 Freeman Mixed Board-a-Match (1) 2014
 Grand National Teams (1) 2011
 Machlin Women's Swiss Teams (2) 2008, 2013
 Wagar Women's Knockout Teams (3) 1986, 1992, 1994
 Sternberg Women's Board-a-Match Teams (2) 1991, 2001
 Chicago Mixed Board-a-Match (1) 1981

References

External links
 
 PALMER Mary  athlete information at the 1st SportAccord World Mind Games (2011)

1952 births
2019 deaths
American contract bridge players
People from Silver Spring, Maryland
Place of birth missing
Venice Cup players
20th-century American lawyers